Saint-Paul-de-la-Croix is a municipality in Quebec, Canada, in the regional county municipality of Rivière-du-Loup Regional County Municipality and the administrative region of Bas-Saint-Laurent.

See also
 List of municipalities in Quebec

References

External links
 

Incorporated places in Bas-Saint-Laurent
Municipalities in Quebec
Canada geography articles needing translation from French Wikipedia